Kangmar may refer to:

Kangmar County, Tibet
Kangmar Town, Tibet